Karbas Saray-e Olya (also Romanized as Karbās Sarāy-e ‘Olyā; also known as Karbās Sarā-ye Bālā and Karbās Sar-e Bālā) is a village in Rahimabad Rural District, Rahimabad District, Rudsar County, Gilan Province, Iran. At the 2006 census, its population was 60, in 14 families.

References 

Populated places in Rudsar County